Verticordia densiflora var. rosteostella is a flowering plant in the myrtle family, Myrtaceae and is endemic to the south-west of Western Australia. It is a shrub with small leaves and small groups of star-like, yellowish and pink flowers. It is one of 5 varieties of the species Verticordia densiflora.

Description

The flowers are star-like, creamy-white and pink, sometimes lemon and pink. Flowering occurs from September to December.

Taxonomy and naming
Verticordia densiflora was first formally described by John Lindley in 1839 and the description was published in A Sketch of the Vegetation of the Swan River Colony. In 1991, Alex George undertook a review of the genus Verticordia and described five varieties of Verticordia densiflora including this variety.

Distribution and habitat
This variety of V. densiflora usually grows in sand, sometimes with gravel or loam, often with other species of Verticordia in heath and shrubland. It occurs between Kalbarri and Eneabba near the coast and as far inland as Morawa in the Avon Wheatbelt and Geraldton Sandplains biogeographic regions.

Conservation
Verticordia densiflora var. rosteostella is classified as "Priority Three" by the Western Australian Government Department of Parks and Wildlife meaning that it is poorly known and known from only a few locations but is not under imminent threat.

Use in horticulture
This variety is difficult to propagate and few attempts have been successful. Its attractive appearance in flower in the wild suggests it has horticultural potential.

References

densiflora var. rosteostella
Rosids of Western Australia
Eudicots of Western Australia
Plants described in 1991